Princess Helen of Serbia ( – 16 October 1962) was a Serbian princess, the daughter of King Peter I of Serbia and his wife Princess Zorka of Montenegro. She was the elder sister of George, Crown Prince of Serbia and King Alexander I of Yugoslavia. Helen was also a niece of Queen Elena of Italy, Princess Anastasia of Montenegro (or "Stana"), wife of Grand Duke Nicholas Nikolaevich of Russia and of Princess Milica of Montenegro, wife of Grand Duke Peter Nikolaevich of Russia, the women who introduced Grigori Rasputin to Tsarina Alexandra.

Early life
The strong-minded, purposeful Helen, whose mother died when she was a small child, was born in Cetinje, Montenegro, and was brought up largely under the care of her aunts Stana and Milica. She was educated in Russia at the Smolny Institute, a school in St. Petersburg for well-born girls. "She was a very sweet-faced though plain girl, with beautiful dark eyes, very quiet and amiable in manner," wrote Margaretta Eagar, governess to the daughters of Tsar Nicholas II. Eagar wrote that Helen, then about seventeen, often came to tea with another of her aunts, Princess Vjera of Montenegro, and cousins. Young Grand Duchess Olga Nikolaevna of Russia was very fond of her.

Engagement and marriage

A fourth aunt, Queen Elena of Italy, invited her for a visit and introduced her to Prince John Constantinovich of Russia. He proposed marriage soon after. It was a love match, a surprise to the family because the gentle, introverted John had thought of becoming a Russian Orthodox monk. "Perhaps you know that Ioanchik is engaged to Helene of Serbia, it is so touching," wrote his distant cousin, 14-year-old Grand Duchess Tatiana Nikolaevna of Russia, to her aunt, Grand Duchess Olga Alexandrovna of Russia, on 14 July 1911. "How funny if they might have children, can they be kissing him? What foul, fie!" The couple married on 3 September 1911, at the Saints Peter and Paul Chapel of the Peterhof Palace in Saint Petersburg. After the marriage, she retained her Royal Highness status, which meant that she had the right to receive diplomats in her own right, unlike her husband, who held only the His Highness status, due to being male-line great-grandson of an Emperor.

Helen studied medicine at the Saint Petersburg Imperial University following their marriage, a career pursuit she had to give up when she gave birth to her first child. The couple had two children, Prince Vsevelod Ivanovich of Russia (20 January 1914 – 18 June 1973), and Princess Catherine Ivanovna of Russia (Pavlovsk 12 July 1915 - Montevideo, Uruguay 14 July 2007). The three children and seven grandchildren of her daughter Princess Catherine, who married and later separated from Marchese Farace di Villaforesta, are the only great-grandchildren of Grand Duke Constantine Constantinovich of Russia and his wife Grand Duchess Elizabeth Mavrikievna.

Revolution

Helen voluntarily followed her husband into exile when he was arrested following the Russian Revolution of 1917 and tried to obtain his release. John was imprisoned first at Yekaterinburg, Siberia and later moved to Alapaevsk, a town in Sverdlovsk Oblast by the Bolsheviks, where he would be murdered on 18 July 1918 along with Grand Duchess Elizabeth Feodorovna, Grand Duke Sergei Mikhailovich; John's brothers Prince Constantine Constantinovich and Prince Igor Constantinovich, his distant cousin Prince Vladimir Pavlovich Paley; Grand Duke Sergei's secretary, Fyodor Remez; and Varvara Yakovleva, a sister from the Grand Duchess Elizabeth's convent. They were herded into the forest by the local Bolsheviks, pushed into an abandoned mineshaft and grenades were then hurled into the mineshaft.

Imprisonment
John had persuaded Helen to leave Alapaevsk and go back to their two young children, whom she had left with John's mother, Grand Duchess Elizabeth Mavrikievna of Russia. In June 1918, Helen visited the Ipatiev House and demanded to see the tsar, secretly hoping to pass on letters to the imperial family from their relatives. After being refused entry by the guards (who had their rifles aimed at her), she went to the Amerikanskaya Hotel half a mile away, making repeated enquiries to the Cheka. She was however arrested by the secret police and imprisoned herself in Perm. The following month, in July 1918, her husband John and several other captive members of the imperial family were killed by the Bolsheviks.

During her imprisonment, the Bolsheviks brought a girl who called herself Anastasia Romanova to her cell and asked Helen if the girl was Grand Duchess Anastasia Nikolaevna of Russia, the daughter of Tsar Nicholas II. Helen said she didn't recognize the girl and the guards took her away. Two weeks later, Helen was put on a train back to Petrograd.

Exile
Swedish diplomats obtained permission for Helen's mother-in-law Grand Duchess Elizabeth Mavrikievna to leave Russia with Helen's children, Vsevelod and Catherine, and her own two younger children, Prince George Constantinovich and Princess Vera Constantinovna, in October 1918 aboard the Swedish ship Ångermanland. Helen remained imprisoned at Perm until Norwegian diplomats located her and had her transferred. She was then kept prisoner at the Kremlin Palace before finally being allowed to leave and join her children in Sweden. Helen eventually settled in Nice, France. She never remarried.

Ancestry

Notes

References

Margaret Eagar, Six Years at the Russian Court,, alexanderpalace.org
Peter Kurth, Anastasia: The Riddle of Anna Anderson, 1983.
Robert K. Massie, Nicholas and Alexandra, 1967
Rappaport, Helen (2008) Ekaterinburg: The Last Days of the Romanovs, St. Martin's Press: New York. .
Zeepvat, Charlotte (2000) Romanov Autumn: Sutton Publishing: Stroud, UK. .
Zeepvat, Charlotte (2004) The Camera and the Tsars: A Romanov Family Album, Sutton Publishing: Stroud, UK. .

1884 births
1962 deaths
Russian princesses by marriage
20th-century Serbian royalty
Yugoslav princesses
Serbian expatriates in Russia
Karađorđević dynasty
Emigrants from the Russian Empire to Sweden
Emigrants from the Russian Empire to France
Daughters of kings